The 1896 Delaware football team was an American football team that represented Delaware College (later renamed the University of Delaware) as an independent during the 1896 college football season. The team was led by its first head coach, Ira Pierce, and compiled a record of 0–6.

Schedule

References

Delaware
Delaware Fightin' Blue Hens football seasons
College football winless seasons
Delaware football